William Chase Daniel (born October 7, 1986) is an American football quarterback who is a free agent. He played college football at Missouri and was signed by the Washington Redskins as an undrafted free agent in 2009. Daniel has also played for the Kansas City Chiefs, Philadelphia Eagles, New Orleans Saints, Chicago Bears, and Detroit Lions.

Early years
Daniel prepped under head coach Todd Dodge at Carroll High School in Southlake, Texas, which won the 5A Division II state title in 2004, 2005, and 2006. After playing his sophomore year at wide receiver, Daniel was a two-year starter at quarterback, leading his team to a 31–1 record. He completed 65.2% of his passes for 8,298 yards and 91 touchdowns and added 2,954 rushing yards and 39 scores. Southlake earned a No. 1 national ranking in 2004 after winning the 5A state championship, while Daniel won the 5A state Player of the Year. He was also named the EA Sports National Player of the Year.

As a junior, Daniel threw for 3,681 yards with 42 touchdowns and nine interceptions. In addition, he ran for 1,529 yards with 18 touchdowns.

Despite his impressive statistics, Daniel was not recruited heavily by his preferred school, Texas. This presented an opportunity for Missouri to recruit him to be part of its resurgent program. Ironically, after he committed to Mizzou, Longhorn coach Mack Brown began to seriously look at Daniel, but Daniel stuck to his commitment. He was also offered scholarships by Maryland, Oklahoma State, Stanford, and Texas A&M.

During high school, Daniel was a member of National Honor Society, and a member of his school's student council for three years.

College career
Daniel enjoyed an illustrious college career at the University of Missouri, passing for more than 12,000 yards and throwing for more than 100 touchdowns. He is widely considered one of the most successful quarterbacks in the school's history.

Although he was not Missouri's most heralded NFL prospect, Daniel raised the football program's profile significantly as a three-year starter and arguably laid the groundwork for the Tigers' eventual move to the Southeastern Conference in 2012 by guiding the Tigers to within one win of a BCS National Championship berth in 2007.

2005 season
Daniel was the primary backup quarterback for Brad Smith in the 2005 season and played in 10 games. He completed 38-of-66 passes for 247 yards, one touchdown, and two interceptions. On October 15, he was 16-of-23 for 185 passing yards and a touchdown against Iowa State.

2006 season
Daniel started all 13 games in 2006 as Missouri earned a berth in the Brut Sun Bowl. He threw for 3,527 yards with a 63.5 percent completion rate and 28 touchdowns. Daniel also set a school record for passing touchdowns in a game, racking up five scores in the season opener against Murray State. This was good enough for a Second-team All-Big 12 selection while he also was named to the First-team All-Academic Big 12 Team. Daniel was also one of the 35 quarterbacks placed on the 2007 Manning Award watch list.

2007 season

Daniel improved in 2007, throwing for 4,306 yards with a 68.2 percent completion rate and 33 touchdowns, with only 11 interceptions in 14 games. He also rushed for a net 253 yards and four touchdowns for a total offense of 37 touchdowns and 4,559 yards, which was good for an average of almost 326 yards per game. He led the Tigers to the cusp of a national championship appearance; in late November 2007, the program surged to #1 in the Associated Press poll for the first time since 1960.

After the Tigers defeated arch rival Kansas, the edition of December 3, 2007, of Sports Illustrated featured Daniel on the cover, with the caption "Mizzou, That's Who." Despite losing to the Oklahoma Sooners in the Big 12 Championship Game, the Tigers dominated Arkansas in the Cotton Bowl on New Year's Day.

On November 27, 2007, the Big 12 Conference named Daniel the Offensive Player of the Year. He is the first Missouri player to receive that honor.

On December 5, 2007, Daniel was invited by the Heisman Trophy Trust to go to New York City as one of four finalists. He finished fourth in the Heisman Trophy voting with 425 points. He garnered 25 first-place votes, 84 second-place votes, and 182 third-place votes. He became the third Tiger to finish in the top ten. His fourth-place showing marks the second-highest finish in Heisman voting by a Missouri Tigers player, with Paul Christman the only one to finish higher (third in 1939).

On January 1, 2008, Missouri wrapped up a school-best 12–2 season with a 38–7 win over Arkansas in the Cotton Bowl. A week later, the Tigers were ranked #4 in the Associated Press' final poll – the highest final ranking in school history – and #5 in the ESPN/USA Today coaches' poll. Daniel also announced he was returning for his senior season after putting his name in with the NFL College Advisory Committee to receive feedback for the NFL Draft.

2008 season
In the 2008 preseason, Daniel was named one of 26 candidates for the 2008 Unitas Award, given to the nation's best senior college football quarterback. He continued to break virtually all Mizzou passing records, and in a two-game span against Southeast Missouri State and Nevada, he threw for more touchdowns (seven) than he did incomplete passes (six).

Daniel appeared on the cover of ESPN the Magazine with teammate Chase Patton.

Daniel donned #25 in honor of fallen teammate Aaron O'Neal. O'Neal died before beginning his freshman year during practice in July 2005, and would have been a senior in 2008. The number rotated among the senior class that season.

Daniel became the Missouri career total offense yardage leader on December 6, with 13,256. He moved ahead of Brad Smith. Missouri finished with 10 wins and a #19 ranking in AP Polls.

Missouri ended 2008 with a 10-win record, culminating with a victory over Northwestern in the Valero Alamo Bowl.

Statistics

Awards and honors
2× Heisman Trophy candidate (2007, 2008)
2006 First-team Academic All-Big 12
2006 ESPN The Magazine First-team Academic All-District
2006 Big 12 Offensive Player of the Week (Sep 4 and Nov. 27)
2006 AP Honorable Mention All-Big 12
2006 Second-team All-Big 12
2007–08 Big 12 Male Athlete of the Year
2007 Big 12 Offensive Player of the Week (Oct 8, Nov 5, and Nov. 26)
2007 First-team Academic All-Big 12
2007 CoSIDA/ESPN The Magazine Academic All-District First-team
2007 First Team All-Big 12 (AP, Coaches)
2007 Big 12 Offensive Player of the Year (AP, Coaches)
2007 All-America Honorable Mention (Sports Illustrated)
2007 All-America Second-team (AP, Walter Camp, Sporting News)
2007 Maxwell Award semifinalist
2007 finalist for Manning Award, Walter Camp Award, Davey O'Brien Award
2007 Heisman Trophy finalist – finished 4th
2008 Preseason Big 12 Offensive Player of the Year
2008 Draddy Trophy runner-up

Professional career

Some scouts considered Daniel among the best quarterbacks in the 2009 Draft, but they had concerns about his height and whether his skills in the college spread offense would translate to the very different game played in the NFL. Daniel's height was measured as 6 ft 0 in at the NFL Scouting Combine. He weighed in at 218 pounds. Daniel ran a 4.86 and 4.79 in the 40 and had a nine-foot broad jump in his Pro Day.

Washington Redskins 
Daniel was not selected in the 2009 NFL Draft, but was signed as an undrafted free agent by the Washington Redskins. The Redskins waived him when making their final roster cuts on September 5, 2009.

New Orleans Saints
Daniel was signed to the New Orleans Saints practice squad on September 6, 2009. He was promoted to the active roster on September 26, and named the emergency third quarterback for the September 27 game against the Buffalo Bills. The Saints waived Daniel on October 12, 2009, after placekicker Garrett Hartley (coincidentally, a teammate of Daniel's at Southlake Carroll High School) came back from a four-game suspension, then re-signed him on October 16. On November 17, 2009, ESPN reported that Daniel had been cut once again, to allow the Saints to sign cornerback Chris McAlister. He was signed to the team's practice squad again on November 20, 2009. He was released from the practice squad on December 9, 2009, only to be re-signed to the practice squad two days later. Daniel was promoted to the active roster before the regular season finale on January 1, 2010. He was a member of the New Orleans Saints Super Bowl XLIV Championship team, although he did not take the field that season.

Going into the 2010 season, Daniel was expected to battle with veteran Patrick Ramsey for the backup quarterback position behind Drew Brees. Daniel and Ramsey put up similar numbers during the preseason, but on September 3, it was reported that Daniel had been chosen as backup quarterback; the team waived Ramsey. He signed a new one-year contract with the Saints in March 2012. He continued as the primary backup to Brees, as well as the team's placekick holder, for the 2010, 2011, and 2012 seasons.

Kansas City Chiefs

Daniel signed with the Kansas City Chiefs on March 12, 2013. For 2013, he was secured as the backup to Alex Smith. In Week 14 of the 2013 NFL season, Daniel played against the Redskins and was 1 for 3 in passing with an interception. The Chiefs won, 45–10. In Week 17, with the Chiefs locked into the #5 seed in the playoffs, Daniel started his first regular-season NFL game, a 24–27 overtime loss to the San Diego Chargers, going 21/30 for 200 yards and one touchdown pass, while rushing for an additional 59 yards. His final 2013 stats were 248 yards, one touchdown, and one interception.

Daniel returned to the Chiefs for the 2014 season as Smith's backup. Before week 17 against the Chargers, it was announced that Smith had suffered a lacerated spleen and would miss the game and possibly the playoffs, giving Daniel the start on Week 17 for the second straight year. This time, Daniel led the Chiefs to a 19–7 victory over the Chargers. The victory eliminated the Chargers from playoff contention.

Daniel remained with the Chiefs in the 2015 season but appeared in relief in only two games in the regular season and the 30–0 victory over the Houston Texans in the Wild Card Round of the playoffs.

Philadelphia Eagles
On March 9, 2016, Daniel signed a three-year, $21 million contract with the Philadelphia Eagles. In the 2016 season, he was the backup to rookie Carson Wentz, whom the Eagles chose with the second overall pick. He appeared in two games in the 2016 season. On March 13, 2017, hours after the Eagles signed free agent quarterback and former Philadelphia Eagle Nick Foles, Daniel requested his release from the team, and was granted the request.

New Orleans Saints (second stint) 
On March 29, 2017, Daniel signed a one-year contract to return to the Saints. In the 2017 season, he appeared in one game, against the Buffalo Bills, in relief of Brees.

Chicago Bears 
On March 14, 2018, Daniel signed a two-year, $10 million contract with the Chicago Bears with $7 million guaranteed.

For the 2018 regular season, he served as the backup to Mitchell Trubisky. In week four, he saw action against the Tampa Bay Buccaneers on a trick play nicknamed "Willy Wonka", which had been designed by coach Matt Nagy and the quarterbacks and named by Daniel days before the game. On the Buccaneers' three-yard line, Daniel joined Trubisky in the backfield in the shotgun formation. Before the play began, receiver Taylor Gabriel and tight end Trey Burton moved along the line of scrimmage to confuse the defense. Upon receiving the snap, Trubisky quickly pitched the ball forward to Gabriel on a shovel pass. Trubisky then faked a hand-off to Daniel as Gabriel scored the touchdown.

On November 21, Daniel was named the starter for the Week 12 Thanksgiving matchup against the Detroit Lions due to a shoulder injury to Trubisky. It was his third career start and his first since Week 17 of the 2014 season with the Chiefs. He completed 27 of 37 pass attempts for 230 yards with two touchdowns and no interceptions in a 23–16 Bears victory.

Daniel remained the starter in the next week's game against the New York Giants. He completed 26 of 39 passes for 285 yards with a touchdown and two interceptions (both by Giants linebacker Alec Ogletree, one of which was returned for a touchdown), and was sacked five times as the Bears lost in overtime, 30–27. Trubisky returned to the starting role a week later.

In Week 4 of the 2019 season against the Minnesota Vikings, Daniel replaced an injured Trubisky in the first quarter. He completed 22 of 30 passes for 195 yards and a touchdown to Tarik Cohen as the Bears won 16–6. With Trubisky unable to play the following week's game against the Oakland Raiders in London, Daniel started as quarterback. Although he threw for 231 yards and two touchdowns, he was also intercepted twice, once late in the game, as the Bears lost, 24–21.
In Week 11 against the Los Angeles Rams on Sunday Night Football, Daniel was put into the game late in the fourth quarter after Trubisky was benched. He threw for nine yards as the Bears lost, 17–7.

Detroit Lions
On March 24, 2020, Daniel signed a three-year, $13.05 million contract with the Detroit Lions.

Daniel made his first appearance for the Lions during Week 9 against the Minnesota Vikings after starter Matthew Stafford left the game in the fourth quarter. He completed 8 of 13 passes for 94 yards, a touchdown, and an interception as the Lions lost, 34–20.

On March 18, 2021, Daniel was released by the Lions.

Los Angeles Chargers
On March 31, 2021, Daniel signed with the Los Angeles Chargers. He served as the backup to Justin Herbert, appearing in one game.

On March 17, 2022, Daniel re-signed with the Chargers.

NFL career statistics

Regular season

Personal life
Chase is the son of Bill and Vickie Daniel.  He married his longtime girlfriend, Hillary Mullin, in 2014. They have three children together.

Daniel is a Christian. When he was with the Eagles, Daniel hosted a weekly Bible study for couples.

On March 5, 2011, Daniel announced that he was establishing and endowing an athletic scholarship for Missouri football recruits from Texas.

See also
List of Division I FBS passing yardage leaders
List of Division I FBS passing touchdown leaders

References

External links

Los Angeles Chargers bio
Missouri Tigers bio

1986 births
Living people
People from Irving, Texas
People from Southlake, Texas
Sportspeople from the Dallas–Fort Worth metroplex
Players of American football from Texas
American football quarterbacks
Missouri Tigers football players
Chicago Bears players
Detroit Lions players
Kansas City Chiefs players
New Orleans Saints players
Philadelphia Eagles players
Washington Redskins players
Los Angeles Chargers players